Smoke was a band from the Cabbagetown neighborhood of Atlanta, Georgia that dissolved in 1999 with the death of writer/singer Benjamin. Benjamin was the subject of Peter Sillen and Jem Cohen's documentary Benjamin Smoke (2000).

History 
The group formed during the demise of the Opal Foxx Quartet, starting with Benjamin on vocals, Bill Taft on cornet and banjo, Brian Halloran on cello, and Todd Butler on guitar.  Coleman Lewis and Tim Campion later joined on guitar and drums, respectively, followed by Will Fratesi on drums. 
Their last show was New Year's Eve, 1998. Benjamin died January 29, 1999.

Bill Taft and Will Fratesi went on to form Hubcap City, who are still active in the Atlanta area.

Former guitarist Coleman Lewis died from a heroin overdose in May 2014.

Discography
Pretend 7" (1993, Colossal Records)
 Pretend
 Dirt
Heaven on a Popsicle Stick CD (1994, LongPlay Records)
 Hole
 Awake
 Freak (Winn's Song)
 The Trip
 Hank Aaron (lyrics by Dana Kletter)
 Luke's Feet
 Beeper Will
 The Pond
 I Do
 Ballet
 Guilt
 Abigail
 Curtains
Another Reason To Fast CD (1995, LongPlay Records)
 Trust
 Friends
 When It Rains
 Clean White Bed
 Shadow Box
 Dream
 Fatherland
 Train Song
 Debbey's Song
 Chad
 That Look
 I Don't
 Snake

Compilation appearances
 ? CD (1992)
 Smoke - Dog
The lineup on this song was Benjamin, Bill Taft, Brian Halloran, and Todd Butler. This CD was a benefit compilation. 
 Radio Oddyssey Volume 2: The Georgia Music Show CD (1997 Altered Records/Ichiban)
 The Rock*A*Teens - Black Ice
 The Continentals - Please, Please
 Pineal Ventana - Dark Cloud
 DQE - Mermaid And The Sailor
 No. 1 Family Mover - Hey Soul
 Bob - Ants
 Velvet Overkill Five - Pillow Talk
 The Goodies - Live On WRAS-FM
 Tweezer - Sucking Midgets
 Marcy - Driver
 Heinous Bienfang - Stay Behind The Cones
 Babyfat - Redd Lobster
 Frontstreet - Scandinavian Pamphlet (Sex Book)
 17 Years - Doing Wrong
 Smoke - Hamlet
 Benjamin - Big Daddy Story and Other Saucy Tales
 
 Rudy's Rockin' Kiddie Caravan CD (1997 Bloodshot Records)
 Susie Honeyman - Bus
 Schoolly D - This Old Man
 Smoke - Old Joe Clark
 Calexico - The Man on the Flying Trapeze
 The Waco Brothers - Them Bones
 Giant Sand - Blow the Man Down
 Anne Richmond Boston - What Can the Matter Be?
 D. L. Menard & the Louisiana Aces - J'ai Passe Devant Ta Porte?
 Zydeco Elvis - The ABC Song
 Sally Timms - Hush Little Baby
 New Orleans Klezmer All Stars - Nokas for the Kinder
 The Chiselers - Playmate
 The Rock*A*Teens - She'll Be Coming 'Round the Mountain
 Moonshine Willy - Skip to My Lou
 Kelly Hogan - The Great Titanic
 The Black Mama Dharma Band - A Frozen Road
 Mekons - Oranges & Lemons
 New Kingdom - John Henry
 Rob Gal - Twinkle Twinkle Little Star
 Blacktop Rockets - Froggy Went A-Courtin'
 Vic Chesnutt - Home on the Range
 The Grifters - The Muffin Man

 Hidden Tracks] CD (2000, Daemon Records)

 Kick Me - Arms
 Smoke - Midnight
 DQE - Ivytwine
 Parlour - The Cold Snap
 Kick Me - Black Coat
 Kick Me - Blue Midnight
 Parlour - Baby Doll
 Bill Taft & Neil Fried - Old West
 Smoke - Pretend
 Palookaville - Seventh Day
 Long Flat Red - Eighty-Six Days
 Railroad Earth - Keep Seeing That Soul
 Kick Me - Lucky Nights
 The Hollidays - Miles Away

References

External links
 
 Smoke's fan-made Myspace
 Rare Smoke mp3s and more info

Rock music groups from Georgia (U.S. state)
Musical groups from Atlanta
Musical groups disestablished in 1999